C'è un fantasma nel mio letto is a 1981 commedia sexy all'italiana directed by Claudio Giorgi. It is the last film directed by Giorgi.

Plot 
A young newlywed couple on the first night of honeymoon, unable to find a hotel, go to an old castle where the presence of a ghost will make their holiday a nightmare.

Cast 
 Lilli Carati as Adelaide Fumagalli
 Vincenzo Crocitti as Camillo Fumagalli
 Renzo Montagnani as Archibald Trenton
 Vanessa Hidalgo as Meg
 Guerrino Crivello as Angus 
 Luciana Turina as Josephina

Production
During production of the film, the director mentioned that the film was inspired by René Clair's The Ghost Goes West. Film historian and critic Roberto Curti commented that there was very little of Clair's film related to C'è un fantasma nel mio letto.

Release
C'è un fantasma nel mio letto was distributed theatrically in Italy by Cinedaf on 3 April 1981. It was later distributed in Spain as Hay un fantasma en mi cama on 28 November 1981. Curti described the film as being "passed almost unnoticed" by audiences in Italy. In Spain it was a greater success where it has been seen by 278,981 spectators and grossed an equivalent to 266,886 Euro.

References

Footnotes

Sources

External links

1981 films
Italian sex comedy films
Spanish sex comedy films
Commedia sexy all'italiana
Italian haunted house films
Films scored by Piero Umiliani
1980s sex comedy films
1981 comedy films
1980s Italian films
Italian-language Spanish films